Movie Crazy is a 1932 American Pre-Code comedy film starring Harold Lloyd in his third sound feature.

The film's copyright was renewed in 1959.

Plot
Harold Hall, a young man with little or no acting ability, desperately wants to be in the movies.

After a mix-up with his application photograph, he gets an offer to have a screen-test, and goes off to Hollywood. At the studio, he does everything wrong and causes all sorts of trouble. But he catches the fancy of a beautiful actress, and eventually the studio owner recognizes him as a comic genius.

Cast
 Harold Lloyd as Harold Hall / Trouble
 Constance Cummings as Mary Sears
 Kenneth Thomson as Vance
 Louise Closser Hale as Mrs Kitterman
 Spencer Charters as J.L. O'Brien
 Robert McWade as Wesley Kitterman, Producer
 Eddie Fetherston as Bill (assistant director)
 Sydney Jarvis as The Director
 Harold Goodwin as Miller
 Mary Doran as Margie
 DeWitt Jennings as Mr Hall
 Lucy Beaumont as Mrs Hall
 Arthur Housman as the Customer "Who Didn't Order Rabbit"
 Grady Sutton as the "Man Afraid of Mice"
 Noah Young as Traffic Policeman
 Edward Peil Sr. as Waiter (uncredited)

Background
The film was a major box office success. An estimated $675,000 was spent on the production and the film grossed over $1,439,000 in the United States alone. The film also proved to be a major critical success as the vast majority of film reviewers praised the picture highly.  Cartoonist Ernie Bushmiller provided gags for the film.

Renewed interest in Harold Lloyd
In 1962, scenes from this film were included in a compilation film produced by Harold Lloyd himself entitled Harold Lloyd's World of Comedy. The film premiered at the Cannes Film Festival and created a renewal of interest in the comedian by introducing him to a whole new generation.

See also
List of United States comedy films

References

External links
 
 
 

1932 films
1932 romantic comedy films
American black-and-white films
American romantic comedy films
Films about actors
Films directed by Clyde Bruckman
Films directed by Harold Lloyd
Paramount Pictures films
1930s English-language films
1930s American films